Bangay (Punjabi and ) is a village of Faisalabad District (previously Lyallpur) in the Punjab province of Pakistan. It is at 31°24'0N 73°18'0E with an altitude of 181 metres (597 feet). Bangay Chak is 20 km from Faisalabad and same distance from Jaranwala off Jaranwala-Faisalabad Road. It is about 133 km from provincial capital Lahore. It is the birthplace of Bhagat Singh.

Attractions
Bhagat Singh was born in the village in 1907. The Government of Pakistan has declared it to be a national heritage site and the Government of Punjab, India has offered help for the purchase and setting up of a world-class memorial.

An annual memorial fair is held in the village on 23 March, which is the anniversary of Singh's death.

Education
There are two high schools for both boys and girls and many private schools as well.

References

Memorials to Bhagat Singh
Villages in Faisalabad District